Mary Immaculate Hospital is a former hospital in Queens, NY.  It was part of the Saint Vincent's Catholic Medical Center network
An attempt to save the hospital was made the hospital with a purchase by Jamaica Hospital.

Current
The Hospital is to be converted into luxury apartments.

References

Defunct hospitals in Queens
Buildings and structures in Queens, New York